The Canadian property bubble refers to a significant rise in Canadian real estate prices from 2002 to present (with short periods of falling prices in 2008 and 2017) which some observers have called a real estate bubble. From 2003 to 2018, Canada saw an increase in home and property prices of up to 337% in some cities. By 2018, home-owning costs were above 1990 levels when Canada saw its last housing bubble burst. Bloomberg Economics ranks Canada as the second largest housing bubble across the OECD in 2019 and 2021. Starting in February 2022, prices started to decline rapidly as the Bank of Canada hiked interest rates culminating in detached prices to decline by $400,000 in the Greater Toronto Area by September of 2022.

History

Background factors 
Canada's last housing bust happened during the early 1990s recession, when Canada was facing low commodity prices, a large national debt and deficit that was weakening the value of the Canadian dollar, the possibility of Quebec independence, and a recession in Canada's main trading partner, the United States. Average house prices (adjusted for inflation) declined continuously in Toronto from 1989 to 1996.

The decline of Quebec separatism after the 1995 referendum and the 2000s commodities boom (caused by rising demand from the United States and China) significantly strengthened personal finances among the middle and upper classes in Canada. During this time, significant rural-to-urban migration and immigration to Canada put pressure on house prices in major cities.

It is speculated that the handover of Hong Kong in 1997, in particular caused many wealthy Hongkongers to immigrate (at least temporarily) to Canada, acquire a second nationality and buy assets safe from communist Chinese authorities. This was later emulated by many mainland Chinese who grew wealthy during China's economic boom and were looking for overseas investment opportunities.

This influx of foreign investment was reinforced by local speculative activity facilitated at a steady drop in interest rates. Once the pattern of rising prices was established, consumers interpreted this as proof that the real estate market had become the perfect option for stable, long-term investments. There is debate on which group of investors, overseas or domestic, play a bigger role in driving rising prices. The belief that there was a limited supply of homes on the real estate market quickly brought new consumers into the market. In addition, owning a home is a sought-after ideal for many young adults in Canada. These social pressures, along with increasing opportunities for profit, were the driving forces behind the growth of the market, causing first-time home buyers to struggle to find affordable housing.

In March 2017, the cost of owning a home in the Greater Toronto Area had grown 33% in only one year, with 19% of the growth occurring in the previous two months. Even less desirable semi-detached homes had surpassed C$1 million in value. Suburban areas had seen large price increases as well. Homes that had not seen upgrades in decades were being sold well over the asking price. Condominium prices were consistently growing each year, even though a large number of units were under construction.

Attempts to slow the growth in 2017
In response to these trends, the Canadian government decided to try to slow the growth of the real estate market and gradually bring down prices, in order to aid first-time home buyers in a way that would cause the bubble to shrink slowly rather than burst. In April 2017, Canada's Federal Finance Minister Bill Morneau, met with Ontario's Minister of Finance Charles Sousa and Mayor of Toronto John Tory, in an attempt to find a solution. This resulted in a foreign buyer tax and speculation tax. In addition, the province of Ontario's Fair Housing Plan set in place stricter rent controls. Uninsured buyers were now required to pass a stress test, in order to see if they can handle a rise in interest rates. These small remedies can account for a slight dip in housing prices in 2017. Ontario has created a Fair Housing Plan consisting of 16 measures to help combat the growth of the real estate market and make housing more affordable. The 16 measures are summarized below.
 Non-resident speculation tax
 Rent is only allowed to rise at rates posted in annual provincial rental increase guideline
 Develop standard leases that would further help protect tenants and insure landlords
 Create a program to balance the value of surplus land assets
 Put a vacant properties tax into place
 Tax to ensure new apartment complexes are similar to current complex properties
 Introduce a 5-year program to facilitate the building of more rental apartments
 Make it easier to use property taxes to generate more development opportunity
 Create Housing Supply team to help uncover and fix barriers to housing development
 Work to fight tax avoidance practices
 Reassess rules involving customer representation in real estate transactions
 Creating a housing group to advise the government about the state of the housing market
 More education for consumers about their real estate rates
 Create more thorough reporting requirements for real estate sales
 Improve reliability of elevators in Ontario buildings
 Updating the Growth Plan for the Greater Golden Horseshoe

These measures have failed to mitigate the property bubble.

2018 and 2019
Canada's price-to-rent ratio surpassed the levels of the US housing bubble in 2006. The private sector debt-to-GDP ratio also rose to 218% in 2018, causing the IMF to warn the country was extremely vulnerable to economic shocks. The Swiss Bank UBS Global Real Estate Bubble Index ranked Toronto and Vancouver as the third and fourth most at risk cities for housing bubble crises. In Alberta, despite a recession and high unemployment, prices still remained high.

Owning a home accounts for roughly 50% of the median household's monthly budget.

The Canadian Mortgage and Housing Corporation cited overbuilding as the main source of the country's housing bubble risk. The amount of household debt in Canada surpassed national GDP.

In April 2019, the Bank of Canada released a report entitled "Disentangling the Factors Driving Housing Resales" in which they stated Canada's housing market is "currently in uncharted territory." While the report does not use the word "bubble," instead using the term "froth," to describe the current state of housing market, it states the rapid increase in pricing in certain markets can be attributed to an unexpectedly robust labour market and fear on the part of buyers of being priced out of the market. The report states, "Much of the previous strength in resale activity was influenced by extrapolative expectations." The report concludes that with increases in household debt, stagnant wages and expected rises in interest rates, a snap-back may be inevitable.

The Bank of Canada estimates that investors, defined as owners who borrow to buy a secondary property while maintaining a mortgage for a primary property, account for around 20% of all home purchases in Canada between 2018 and 2019. StatsCan's Canadian Housing Statistic Program estimated in a 2019 report that one third of the Toronto condo market is owned by people who do not personally live in the units but rent them out or leave them empty.

March 2020 to February 2022 

The housing market experienced a brief slowdown during the onset of the pandemic, especially for condos in larger cities. In response to the pandemic, the Bank of Canada slashed interest rates three times in one month and reduced the mortgage "stress test" so the private banks could accept riskier loans. Prices soon rebounded. By late 2020, average home prices were increasing at a pace not seen since the 2016–2017 housing boom.

This defied many predictions, including those by the CMHC, which had forecasted prices falling by 9–18%. Instead, the average home price increased 23.5% year-over-year. Many markets saw double-digit increases, especially suburbs surrounding major cities and Ottawa. In Oakville, average home prices climbed $74,000 in just four weeks in early January.

In March, Bank of Canada Governor Tiff Macklem said the Bank was only starting to see "early" signs of "excessive exuberance." In a Q&A, he said the Bank was not considering any additional measures to cool the market, saying, "We need the growth." While other countries were attempting to cool their overheated markets, Canada was not, citing concerns about the economic recovery.

By mid-March, the Bank was expected to hold firm on low interest rates until 2023, resisting calls from investors and economists that higher rates were needed to cool the market. However by mid-June, with fiscal spending booming and households flush with cash from stimulus, investors expected the Bank of Canada to begin raising rates in 2022.

In early 2021, Maclean's reported that zoom towns, popular with remote workers, were experiencing population growth at the expense of major urban centres. Notably: During the COVID-19 pandemic in Canada statistics showed that the housing sector grew but much of the rest of the Canadian economy did not. Recent data from Statistics Canada shows that, for the first time on record, investment in the housing market is now greater than 50 per cent of all investment in the Canadian economy.

2022 Canadian real estate market crash 
Starting in February 2022, prices started to decline rapidly as the Bank of Canada hiked interest rates.  Prices for detached house had declined by $400,000 in the Greater Toronto Area by September of 2022. As the Bank of Canada hiked the overnight interest rate above 4%, mortgage rates rose above 5.5% putting more pressure on borrowers. Inflation accelerated due to the energy crisis; therefore there is no end in sight in how high interest rates will go to bring down inflation.  The Teranet-National Bank House Price Index peaked in May of 2022 and had dropped 10% by mid-January 2023, the “largest contraction in the index ever recorded” since it began in 1999.  Contractions from the peak to January of 2023 were notable in London (-26%), Cambridge (-25%), Kitchener-Waterloo (-25%), Brantford (-24%), Hamilton (-23%), the Niagara region (-20%) and Barrie (-20%).

2023 Foreign ownership ban 
On January 1 2023, Canada enacted a law prohibiting foreigners, except for immigrants and permanent residents, from acquiring residential areas in the country for two years in response to a real-estate bubble.

Regional differences 

Some commentators have stated that Canada as whole did not have a real estate bubble, only Toronto and Vancouver really did.  As is typical in all countries, prices vary widely between urban and rural areas, between regions, and between cities within a region. However, as Canadian regions have very different economic bases, the impact of the price increases of the twenty-first century have been almost diametrically opposed in two types of cities: metropolitan regions based on financial services, manufacturing, international trade, services and tourism (the Golden Horseshoe, the Lower Mainland, Southwestern Ontario) have tended to move up most strongly when cities based around resource extraction (e.g. the Calgary-Edmonton Corridor) are flat or declining.  Conversely, resource-dependent cities have had periods of stronger growth than services-focused cities during periods of resource price spikes.

Economic growth, migration rates, and therefore housing prices in Alberta, Saskatchewan, and Newfoundland and Labrador are tied to oil and gas prices, and therefore experienced their strongest growth during and immediately following the oil price spikes of 2003–2008 and 2009–2014. Growth slowed or reversed during and after the oil price drops of 2008–2009 and 2014–2016. The impact of the short-lived 2020 price crash was limited: average housing prices in Alberta overall did not drop year-to-year from 2019 to 2020 as many had predicted, but did drop slightly in Calgary.

Vancouver has experienced more direct foreign investment than other Canadian cities since the 1990s, as well as strong in-migration and has therefore increased faster than the rest of the country. High prices in Vancouver have pushed middle class buyers out to other parts of British Columbia.

Much like in British Columbia, in Ontario the fastest rising prices have been in the main urban centre, Toronto, which, like Vancouver is a major hub for foreign investment and immigration. Rising prices elsewhere in Ontario may be a ripple effect radiating out from Toronto.

Until 2020, Quebec and the Maritime provinces had not seen as dramatic growth in prices as the rest of the country, as their economic growth and population growth is generally much slower.

Immigration to Canada since the mid 2010s has been concentrated largely in Ontario and British Columbia, which has forced prices in those provinces to rise much faster than in other provinces.

People displaced from the major cities by high prices have bid up prices in a limited number of popular smaller cities, creating secondary bubbles in those places, but not in smaller cities and towns generally, which are significantly cheaper in proportion to cities than they were a generation before. The numerically few smaller cities which have grown rapidly are those within the commuter belt of major cities (the 905 region of Ontario or the Fraser Valley in British Columbia) as well as those known as retirement communities, such as Sidney, British Columbia and Charlottetown, Prince Edward Island, as well as in resort towns like Whistler or Kelowna.

In January 2021, the Vancouver Sun reported that $500,000 in Killarney Road, New Brunswick (a commuter town near the provincial capital, Fredericton) could buy a five-bedroom, four-bathroom detached home, whereas in Vancouver the same money would only buy a 495-square-foot one-bedroom condo in Vancouver's Kitsilano neighbourhood.

The economic impact of the COVID-19 pandemic in Canada included a rapid increase in prices in already-desirable suburban and exurban areas. Presumably, this is due to people leaving urban condos because they expect to be spending more time at home (either because of remote work or because they do not feel comfortable spending their off-work hours in crowded urban amenities like restaurants and theatres) and want the space to add a home office or a larger backyard for staycations. However, some urban areas have seen strong growth as well, as people simple trade up for more space but still in a city: often a smaller city near their existing family and work connections, notably smaller cities nearby (but outside of) Greater Toronto. According to a report by the agency Re/max, the strongest growth in the main markets (excluding Quebec) during 2020 was in middle-sized Ontario cities, notably: Windsor (+21%), the Muskokas (+20.3%), and Ottawa (+19.4%). The only declines in a major market were seen in former foreign investment hubs West Vancouver (–1%), and North Vancouver (–0.02%), while nearly-flat prices were seen in oil-exposed markets such as Calgary (+0.02%), Edmonton (+1%) and Regina (+2%). Real estate brokerage firm Royal LePage forecasts (July 2021) that housing prices in Canada will rise to $771,500 by the end of the 2021, 16 per cent above the year-end 2020 level. The largest year-over-year gains are forecast for Greater Montreal at 17.5 per cent, followed by Ottawa and Greater Vancouver.

Money laundering 

According to Stephen Schneider, criminology professor at St. Mary's University in Halifax, "We've never seen anything like this in Canada and you probably won't see anything like this any time soon." Schneider has also said, "I've never seen such a big operation … that is so geographically confined." His comments were part of the Cullen Commission, which is an ongoing public inquiry into money laundering in British Columbia, led by B.C. Supreme Court Justice Austin Cullen. The Cullen Commission has estimated that in 2019 alone, $5.3 Billion of illicit funds was laundered through the Vancouver real estate market, which increased housing prices by 5%.

Experts refer to "The Vancouver Model" as a way for Chinese organized crime to launder revenue generated primarily by fentanyl sales through casinos.

In 2016, Transparency International Canada found that 33% of the most valuable residential real estate in Vancouver was owned by shell companies and at least 11% have a nominee listed on their title.

Transparency International Canada also studied corporate ownership of Greater Toronto residential real estate and found that between 2008 and 2018, $20 billion of purchases were made using over 50,000 corporations with no checks and balances to determine the beneficial owners or source of funds. Roughly $9.8 Billion (49%) of those purchases were "all cash buys," i.e. no mortgage debt was used for the purchases. In addition, roughly $10 Billion (50%) of the same corporate purchases used mortgages from private unregulated lenders. In contrast, only 11% of households purchase real estate with "all cash" and 3% use private lenders. Additionally, Transparency International Canada has highlighted that part of the problem is lack of data. The availability of real estate ownership data varies by province and is hidden behind a paywall.

Risks
Canada is a nation heavily dependent on the real estate industry which accounts for roughly 14% of its GDP in 2021. There is a high risk that if sentiments begin to change and investors feel the market is about to take a turn for the worse, there will be a mass of people selling their properties, causing prices to drop and potentially snowball. Canadians are increasingly holding large amounts of mortgage related debt, reaching almost $2 trillion dollars of total housing debt in June 2021.

Short-term fixed-rate mortgages are dominant in Canada, typically with the interest rate locked in for five years. This contrasts with the United States, where most homeowners hold long-term fixed-rate mortgage contracts. If the reset rate in five, ten, or fifteen years is higher than in the past, there will be a large risk of default for Canadians with high amounts of debt. Since two-thirds of Canadian mortgages are backed by insurance, a rise in defaults will leave the debts on the hands of the Canadian government and private mortgage insurers. Any drops in home prices could also cause homeowners to owe more on their mortgages than the house is currently valued, which is known as negative equity.

References 

Economic history of Canada
Real estate bubbles of the 2010s
Economy of Canada
Immigration to Canada
Money laundering
Housing in Canada
Inflation in Canada
Infrastructure in Canada
Real estate in Canada
Impact of the COVID-19 pandemic in Canada